Paradan or Paratan was a province of the Paratarajas and the Sasanian Empire. It was constituted from the present-day Balochistan region, which is divided between Iran, Pakistan and Afghanistan.

Paratarajas

Evidence from coins shows that it was located in what is now north-eastern Balochistan, centered around the town of Loralai (now in Pakistan), further east than traditionally thought. Thus it was located roughly where the map places the province of Turan. Paradan has been associated with the territory of the historical Paratarajas (125-300 CE).

Sasanian Empire
The province of Paradan is mentioned in Shapur I's inscription at the Ka'ba-ye Zartosht of 262 CE, one of the many provinces of the Sasanian Empire:

Traditionally, Paradan was held to be further west, in the area of western Balochitan.

See also
Mazun
Gedrosia (satrapy)

References

Sources
 
 Tandon, Pankaj. 2012. "The Location and Kings of Paradan" Studia Iranica, 41 pp 25-56. http://people.bu.edu/ptandon/Paradan.pdf

Provinces of the Sasanian Empire